Beketov is a small lunar impact crater that lies in the northern reaches of the Mare Tranquillitatis.  It is named after Russian chemist Nikolay Beketov. To the south is the ghost crater Jansen R. Northeast of Beketov, along the edge of the mare, is the crater Vitruvius. Beketov was previously designated Jansen C before being named by the IAU. The flooded crater Jansen itself lies to the south.

External links
 LTO-42C3 Dawes — L&PI topographic map

References

 
 
 
 
 
 
 
 
 
 
 

Impact craters on the Moon